Befaqul Madarisiddinia Bangladesh or 
National Religious Madrasa Education Board of Bangladesh is a government-recognized Qawmi Madrasa Board of Education in Bangladesh. It is the newest of the Qawmi Madrasa education boards in Bangladesh. The board was formed on 8 October 2016 under the leadership of Farid Uddin Masood and officially launched on 15 October. There are over 1 thousand madrasas under this board.

See more
Befaqul Madarisil Arabia Bangladesh
Al-Haiatul Ulya Lil-Jamiatil Qawmia Bangladesh

See also 
 List of Deobandi organisations

Reference

External links
Al-Haiatul Ulya

Farid Uddin Masood
Qawmi madrasas of Bangladesh
Deobandi Islamic universities and colleges
Educational institutions established in 2016
2016 establishments in Bangladesh
Deobandi organisations